Sirrah (also spelled SIRRAH, or SIЯRAH, as on their logo) is a progressive gothic metal band from Southwestern Poland. They formed in 1992, released two albums, and disbanded in 1999 due to financial issues. Their music includes elements from death metal, doom metal, and later industrial metal. After their break up, Tom (vocals), Matt (death vocals, guitar), and Chris (keyboards) went on to form a progressive/avant-garde industrial metal band called The Man Called TEA. The band reunited in 2013 and immediately began recording new material, releasing a downloadable single on their new website.

Members

Current line-up
 Roman Bereźnicki - bass guitar, vocals
 Michał Bereźnicki - drums
 Paweł Nafus - guitars
 Roger Trela - guitars 
 Krzysztof Passowicz - keyboards
 Magdalena Brudzińska - violin, vocals
 Tomo Żyżyk - vocals

Past members
Sławomir Lisiecki - bass guitar
Christopher - bass guitar
Bartosz "Bart" Rojewski - drums
Maciej "Matt" Pasiński - guitars
Bai'Sahr - guitars
Maggie - vocals

Discography

Albums

EPs

References

External links
Official website

Polish progressive metal musical groups
Avant-garde metal musical groups
Polish gothic metal musical groups
Doom metal musical groups
Polish symphonic metal musical groups
Polish death metal musical groups
Industrial metal musical groups
Musical groups established in 1992
Musical groups disestablished in 1999
Metal Mind Productions artists